The joule (symbol: J) is the SI derived unit of energy

Joule or joules may also refer to:

People
 Joule (surname)
 James Prescott Joule (1818–1889), English physicist and namesake of the term joule

Places
 12759 Joule, an asteroid
 Joule (crater), on the Moon

Companies and organizations
 Joule Assets, American provider of energy reduction market analysis, tools and financing 
 Joule Centre, an energy research centre based at the University of Manchester, England
 Joule Inc., a subsidiary of the Canadian Medical Association
 Joule Unlimited, formerly Joule Biotechnologies, producer of alternative energy technologies
 Joules (clothing), a British casual clothes brand
 JouleX, former software company
 The Joule Hotel, Dallas, Texas, US

Science and technology
 Joule (programming language)
 Joule cycle, a thermodynamic cycle
 Joule effect and Joule's law, several physical effects discovered by James Prescott Joule
 Joule expansion, a particular thermodynamic process
 Joule heating, process by which the passage of a current through a conductor releases heat
 joule per mole (J/mol), an SI derived unit of energy per amount of material
 joule-second (J∙s), a unit used to measure action or angular momentum
 joule/second (J/s), another term for the watt
 Joule thief, a minimalist self-oscillating voltage booster

Other uses
 Joule (Q84), submarine of the French Navy
 Optimal Energy Joule, an electric car
 Joule (journal), a scientific journal published by Cell Press

See also
 Gough–Joule effect
 Joule–Thomson effect
 Juul (disambiguation)